Teodora Nedeva (born 22 April 1977) is a retired tennis player from Bulgaria.

On 6 March 1995, she reached her highest WTA singles ranking of 409 whilst her best doubles ranking was 168 on 10 July 1995.

Playing for Bulgaria at the Fed Cup, Nedeva has accumulated a win–loss record of 0–3 (all doubles).

ITF Circuit finals

Doubles: 31 (19 titles, 12 runner–ups)

Fed Cup
Teodora Nedeva debuted for the Bulgaria Fed Cup team in 1996.

Doubles

 RR = Round Robin
 PPO = Promotion Play-off

External links

 
 
 

1977 births
Living people
Sportspeople from Plovdiv
Bulgarian female tennis players